The 2017 Carpathian Trophy was the 49th edition of the Carpathian Trophy held in Craiova, Romania between 24 and 26 November as a women's friendly handball tournament organised by the Romanian Handball Federation.

Results

Round robin
All times are local (UTC+02:00).

Statistics

Final standing

Awards
Top Scorer:   
Most Valuable Player: 
Best Goalkeeper:

References

External links
FRH official website

Carpathian Trophy
Carpathian Trophy
Carpathian Trophy
Sport in Craiova
Carpathian Trophy